Unstoppable is a studio album by American country music group The Oak Ridge Boys. It was released in 1991 as their first album for RCA Records. It includes "Lucky Moon", their last Top 40 hit on Hot Country Songs. The album reached number 41 on Top Country Albums.

Two of the cuts on this album were later released as singles by other artists: "Heaven Bound (I'm Ready)" by Shenandoah from their 1995 album In the Vicinity of the Heart, and "Change My Mind" by John Berry from his 1996 album Faces.

Track listing

 Omitted from cassette version.

Chart performance

References

1991 albums
The Oak Ridge Boys albums
RCA Records albums
Albums produced by Richard Landis